Killer Be Killed is an American heavy metal supergroup founded by Dillinger Escape Plan vocalist Greg Puciato and Soulfly frontman Max Cavalera in early 2011. The lineup also features Mastodon bassist and co-vocalist Troy Sanders and Converge drummer Ben Koller. The band had slowly been working on material before announcing its name in October 2013, along with their signing to Nuclear Blast. The group's self-titled debut record was released on May 13, 2014. On September 4, 2020, the group returned with a new single, and released their second album Reluctant Hero on November 20, 2020.

History

Formation, early years and self-titled (2011–2015) 
The band was first announced in February 2011, when Metal Hammer reported news of Puciato and Cavalera planning a new project in the vein of Cavalera's Nailbomb band with Alex Newport in the mid 1990s. Shortly afterwards, Mars Volta's Dave Elitch and Mastodon bassist Troy Sanders were announced to be part of the project. Converge bassist Nate Newton was originally eyed to be included in the project, but was unable to join, so Cavalera reached out to Sanders instead. Despite not yet having a name, the group entered the Fortress Studio in Los Angeles in September 2013 with producer Josh Wilbur.

In October 2013, the band revealed Killer Be Killed as their name and announced that their first album would be released through Nuclear Blast. In March 2014, an announcement confirmed that the band's debut album would be self-titled, Killer Be Killed, and would be released on May 13, 2014. On March 14, 2014, two songs from the upcoming eponymous debut, "Wings of Feather and Wax", and "Face Down" were made available for streaming.

Converge drummer Ben Koller joined for the band's live debut at Soundwave Festival and was announced as a full-fledged member that summer, replacing Elitch.

Reluctant Hero (2016–present) 
In an interview with Full Metal Jackie, Cavalera said he'd love to do another Killer Be Killed album; "I'd love to do a little bit with Killer Be Killed … We did one record and it was very well received, and I think we can do a better one than that. I think we can really — if we work hard on it — we can make a kick ass second Killer Be Killed album." In a 2016 Facebook update Koller announced there is "whispers in the dark of a new Killer Be Killed album". In April 2018, Max Cavalera confirmed that the band were convening in Phoenix to write and rehearse new material in Soulfly's rehearsal space, with the aim of releasing a new album in 2019.

On Friday, September 4, 2020, the band released a brand new song called "Deconstructing Self-Destruction" which features Max, Greg, Troy and Ben credited as writers. The song is the first single off their second album Reluctant Hero which is set for release on November 20, 2020, via Nuclear Blast Records. Wall of Sound broke the news after digging up the album's artwork and tracklisting.

On October 9, 2020, the band released their second single from the album called "Dream Gone Bad".

In an interview with Wall of Sound, bassist Troy Sanders explained why the second album's recording process was kept a secret; "I mentioned to my guys 'every time we get together and work on something, let's just keep it to ourselves' so we don't create any type of buzz or excitement to our small handful of fans." Reluctant Hero was released in November 20, 2020.

Musical style
Commenting on the writing process of their first album, Cavalera told Decibel that the record will be "politically charged" and that the composition will be a merging of styles of each of its members. In a press release, Puciato characterizes the style, "It's a bit of Sabbath-y doom, a bit of thrash, a bit of hardcore and punk" continuing, "Of any of our bands, it sounds the furthest away from mine...", whereas critics have described the band's sound as a progressive form of groove metal, incorporating elements of melodic metalcore, hardcore punk, crossover thrash and progressive rock.

Members
Current members
Greg Puciato – rhythm guitar, vocals (2011–present)
Max Cavalera – rhythm guitar, vocals (2011–present) 
Troy Sanders – bass, vocals (2012–present)
Ben Koller – drums, percussion (2015–present)

Live/session members 
Juan Montoya – lead guitar (2015, 2020–present)

Former members
Dave Elitch – drums, percussion (2012–2015)

Timeline

Discography

Studio albums

Singles and music videos

Accolades

Metal Hammer Golden Gods Awards

|-
| 2015 || Killer Be Killed || Best Live Band ||

References

External links
 Official website

2011 establishments in California
American alternative metal musical groups
American groove metal musical groups
Heavy metal musical groups from California
Heavy metal supergroups
Musical groups established in 2011
Musical groups from Los Angeles
Musical quintets
Political music groups